"Automatisch" and "Automatic" are the first singles from German pop rock band Tokio Hotel's third German studio album and second English studio album Humanoid. "Automatisch" was released in German-speaking countries on 18 September 2009 and "Automatic" was released in the United States on 22 September 2009.

Music video

Craig Wessels of Wicked Pixels, the most-awarded animation-studio in South Africa,
directed the music video, shot over three days in the Kalahari Desert in South Africa. The video features the band driving separately in muscle cars and with computer generated humanoid robots. The music video for "Automatic" was released online on September 3, 2009 while the video for "Automatisch" was released a day later.

Formats and track listings
Automatisch CD-Single: 2 Track

Automatisch CD-Single: Premium

Bonus Tokio Hotel fan magnet

Automatic CD-Single

Automatic Australian iTunes Download

Charts

References

External links
 

Tokio Hotel songs
2009 singles
Songs written by David Jost
Songs written by Bill Kaulitz
Songs written by Tom Kaulitz
2009 songs